The 2017–18 SIU Edwardsville Cougars men's basketball team represented Southern Illinois University Edwardsville during the 2017–18 NCAA Division I men's basketball season. The Cougars, led by third year head coach Jon Harris, played their home games at the Vadalabene Center in Edwardsville, Illinois as members of the Ohio Valley Conference. They finished the season 9–21, 5–13 in OVC play to finish in a three-way tie for ninth place. Due to Southeast Missouri State being ineligible for postseason play due to APR violations, the Cougars received the No. 8 seed in the OVC tournament where they lost in the first round to Tennessee Tech.

Previous season 
The Cougars finished the 2016–17 season 6–24, 1–15 in OVC play to finish in last place in the West Division. They failed to qualify for the OVC tournament.

Preseason 
In a vote of conference coaches and sports information directors, SIUE was picked to finish in 12th place in the OVC.

After five years of divisional play in the OVC, the conference eliminated divisions for the 2017–18 season. Additionally, for the first time, each conference team will play 18 conference games.

Season summary
The Cougars finished the regular season with nine wins and twenty losses, an improvement over the two preceding seasons. Their conference record of 5–12 placed them in a tie for ninth place in the conference standings.

Post season 
The Cougars' ninth place tie was broken by their 2–1 record versus Eastern Kentucky and UT Martin. With Southeast Missouri ineligible for post season play, the Cougars earned the No. 8 seed in the OVC tournament, the schools' first slot in the tournament since 2015.

Awards and honors 
Prior to the start of the OVC Tournament, the conference announced the Cougars senior forward Jalen Henry was named to the All-OVC Second Team.

On March 27, the Ohio Valley Conference announced that the SIUE men's team  are the recipients of the 2017-18 OVC Team Sportsmanship Award for men's basketball.

Roster

Schedule and results

|-
!colspan=9 style=| Exhibition

|-
!colspan=9 style=| Non-conference regular season

|-
!colspan=9 style=| Ohio Valley Conference regular season

|-
!colspan=9 style=|Ohio Valley Conference tournament

References 

SIU Edwardsville
SIU Edwardsville Cougars men's basketball seasons
Edward
Edward